St Andrews is a suburb of Sydney, in the state of New South Wales, Australia 55 kilometres south-west of the Sydney central business district, in the local government area of the City of Campbelltown. It is part of the Macarthur region.

History
The name St Andrews came from an early 19th-century property owned by Scottish convict Andrew Thompson who in turn had named it after the patron saint of Scotland St Andrew.

The area was used for cattle and dairy farming for the next 150 years or so. In 1957, the first plans were announced by the state government to create a large satellite city in the area but the idea foundered after locals opposed it because the land was such good farming land. Nevertheless, the sprawl of Sydney towards Campbelltown couldn't be halted. In 1976, the name St Andrews was approved for the suburb and in 1977, Landcom began building homes in the area. The following year a primary school was opened and the suburb was well established.

Population
In the 2006 Australian Bureau of Statistics Census, the suburb of St Andrews had a population of 5,952 people, with higher than average numbers of Australian citizens (90%) and people born overseas (28%). The most common languages spoken other than English were Arabic (5%), Hindi (2%) and Spanish (2%). The median family income ($1282 per week) was slightly higher than average as was the median housing loan repayment ($1500 per month).

Schools
 St Andrews Public School
 Robert Townson (Primary) - Raby
 Robert Townson High School - Raby
 Mary Immaculate Catholic Primary School - Eaglevale
 Mount Carmel Catholic College - Varroville

References

Suburbs of Sydney
Hume Highway
City of Campbelltown (New South Wales)